= Proliferative phase =

Proliferative phase can refer to:

- a phase of wound healing
- a phase of the menstrual cycle
